Hull City Association Football Club is a professional football club based in Kingston upon Hull in the East Riding of Yorkshire.  The club was founded in 1904 and was initially managed by James Ramster who only took charge of the team for friendly matches.  Ambrose Langley, a former Sheffield Wednesday player managed Hull for over 300 games from 1905 to 1913.  Harry Chapman, Fred Stringer, David Menzies and Percy Lewis held short tenures as manager before Billy McCracken led the club from 1923 to 1931, overseeing 375 matches.  Haydn Green took charge for almost three seasons, leaving the club in 1934 with a win percentage just shy of 50%.

Raich Carter became the next Hull City manager to lead the club for over 100 competitive matches, holding the tenure from March 1948 to September 1951.  Five managers, Bob Jackson, Bob Brocklebank, Cliff Britton, Terry Neill and John Kaye, then led the club over the next 25 years.  Mike Smith and Brian Horton also managed the club for over 100 games, while Terry Dolan took charge for over 300 matches in the 1990s.  Dane Jan Mølby became the first manager from outside the United Kingdom when he took over in April 2002.  His tenure was to be short-lived, he was replaced on a full-time basis after just 17 competitive matches in charge by Peter Taylor.

Phil Brown became the first Hull City manager to lead the club to the top division of English football in 2008 after winning the Football League Championship play-off Finals 1–0 against Bristol City at Wembley Stadium. After a poor run of results, Brown was placed on "garden leave" to be replaced by Iain Dowie in an attempt to keep Hull City in the Premier League, an effort which ended in relegation with Dowie only overseeing a solitary win in his nine games in charge. Nigel Pearson was appointed to stabilise the team following relegation to the Championship, he held the role for 15 months until he was enticed to return to Leicester City, the club he had left to join Hull City. Hull City player Nick Barmby took over, initially in a caretaker role, in November 2011, but was released from his duties the following May, to be replaced by Steve Bruce. On 22 July 2016 the BBC reported that manager Steve Bruce had resigned from his position. This was later confirmed by the club who announced Mike Phelan would act as caretaker manager. On 13 October 2016, Phelan became the head coach.  He was sacked on 3 January 2017. On 5 January 2017, the club announced the appointment of Marco Silva as the new head coach until the end of the 2016–17 season. On 25 May 2017, following relegation from the Premier League head coach Marco Silva resigned. On 9 June 2017, the club announced the appointment of Leonid Slutsky as head coach. On 3 December 2017, Leonid Slutsky left the club by mutual consent after a run of bad results.
On 7 December 2017, Nigel Adkins was appointed as head coach on an 18-month contract. On 8 June 2019, manager Atkins indicated that he would not take-up the offer of a new contract with the club and left the club before the start of the 2019–20 season. On 21 June 2019, Grant McCann was appointed as the new head coach on a one-year rolling contract. Following the takeover of the club by  Acun Medya Group, backed by Acun Ilıcalı, on 19 January 2022,  McCann was sacked a few days later. On 27 January 2022, Shota Arveladze was announced as the new head coach. On 30 September 2022, Arveladze was sacked after a run of four league defeats and Andy Dawson was appointed as interim head coach.
Dawson's temporary reign lasted 8 games, 3 wins and 5 losses were recorded before Liam Rosenior was appointed as his successor on 3 November 2022.

Managers
Updated as of 18 March 2023.  Only professional, competitive matches are counted.

* Caretaker manager
† Temporary football management consultant
‡ Head coach

References

Managers
 
Hull City